WJBS (1440 AM) is a daytime only radio station broadcasting a Gospel format. Licensed to Holly Hill, South Carolina, United States, the station is owned by Harry J Govan, who purchased the station in 2007 after being the station manager for several years.

References

External links

JBS
JBS